Anthony-John Greer (born December 14, 1996) is a Canadian professional ice hockey forward for the Boston Bruins of the National Hockey League (NHL). He was selected in the second round, 39th overall, by the Colorado Avalanche in the 2015 NHL Entry Draft.

Playing career

Amateur
Greer played minor ice hockey in West Lanaudière, and participated in the 2009 Quebec International Pee-Wee Hockey Tournament with his youth team.

Greer first played midget hockey within Quebec helping Collège Esther-Blondin Phénix to a silver medal finish in the 2012 Telus Cup. In the QMAAA, Greer contributed with 15 goals and 28 points in 42 games in the 2011–12 season, including scoring the game-winning goal to capture the Championship. He left his native Quebec to pursue a junior career in the United States, enrolling with Kimball Union Academy of New Hampshire. In his second scholastic season with Kimball, Greer captained the hockey side, and led the team in scoring with 24 goals and 63 points in just 34 games. In the 2013–14 season, Greer enjoyed a brief stint in the United States Hockey League with the Des Moines Buccaneers, recording 2 goals in as many games.

Having previously committed with Boston University, Greer would begin his collegiate career on acceleration in the 2014–15 season. In his freshman year, playing as the youngest forward in the NCAA, Greer made his collegiate debut and scored a goal on October 10, 2014, against the University of Massachusetts. Initially placed in a depth forward role, Greer saw his icetime increase by seasons end, using his size and physical play earning a place on a scoring line in the post-season. Greer contributed with 3 goals and 7 points in 37 games as the Terriers finished as regular season champions and claimed the Hockey East mantle to clinch a Frozen Four berth.

In his sophomore year, Greer anticipated an increased role for the 2015–16 season. Unable to produce offensively and un-willing to accept reduced minutes in a checking-line role, Greer opted to leave the Terriers after 18 games to further his development in his native Quebec, with the Rouyn-Noranda Huskies of the QMJHL on December 19, 2015. In joining the top ranked Huskies, Greer immediately made an impact offensively, contributing with 16 goals in the final 33 regular season games. Placed on the top scoring line in the post-season and serving as an alternate captain, Greer posted 22 points in just 20 games as the Huskies captured the QMJHL Championship before losing in the Memorial Cup final.

Professional
In continuing his unorthodox development path, Greer signalled the end of his brief QMJHL career to turn professional in signing a three-year, entry-level contract with the Colorado Avalanche on July 1, 2016. After attending his first training camp with the Avalanche and eligible to compete in the American Hockey League, Greer was assigned to begin his rookie season with affiliate, the San Antonio Rampage. In the 2016–17 season, Greer made his professional debut with the Rampage, scoring a goal in a 2–1 defeat to the Milwaukee Admirals on October 15, 2016. Making a seamless transition to the professional level, Greer was leading the Rampage and all AHL rookies in scoring before he received his first recall to the Colorado Avalanche on November 12, 2016. He made his NHL debut with the Avalanche in a 2–0 defeat to the Boston Bruins on November 13, 2016. Following a brief return to San Antonio, Greer returned to record his first NHL point, an assist on a Mikhail Grigorenko goal, in a 3–2 loss to the Dallas Stars on November 17, 2016.

After his fifth game with the Avalanche, Greer was returned to the Rampage and continued his scoring pace, earning a rookie record with an assist in seven straight games, tying a franchise record for all skaters. He was selected alongside Spencer Martin as San Antonio's representatives at the AHL All-Star Game. As the team struggled down the stretch of the regular season, Greer appeared in 63 games for 38 points before injury concluded his rookie season. His contributions off the ice to the San Antonio community were recognized as he was awarded the Yanick Dupré Memorial Award as the AHL's Man of the Year.

Greer scored his first NHL on February 20, 2019, when he scored the last goal in the Avalanche's 7–1 win against the Winnipeg Jets. With 33.5 seconds left, Greer jammed the puck in against Connor Hellebuyck.

On October 19, 2019, in a game against the Milwaukee Admirals, Greer was assessed 40 minutes of penalty time and suspended for six games after he left the penalty box to fight Admiral's defenseman, Jarred Tinordi. 

On October 11, 2020, having been unable to cement a role in the NHL with the Avalanche and looking for more opportunity, Greer was traded by Colorado to the New York Islanders in exchange for Kyle Burroughs. As a restricted free agent, Greer agreed to a one-year, two-way contract with the Islanders on October 27, 2020. In the pandemic-delayed 2020–21 season, Greer was assigned by the Islanders to AHL affiliate, the Bridgeport Sound Tigers. In a slow start to the season, Greer posted just one goal and two points in 10 games with the Sound Tigers before he was traded by the Islanders, along with Mason Jobst, a 2021 first-round draft selection and a conditional 2022 fourth-round pick to the New Jersey Devils in exchange for Kyle Palmieri and Travis Zajac on April 7, 2021. He was immediately reassigned to continue in the AHL with the Binghamton Devils.

As a free agent from the Devils, Greer was signed to a two-year, $1.5 million contract to join the Boston Bruins on July 13, 2022.

Personal life
Greer has been very upfront about his struggles with his mental health and emphasis that seeing a sports psychologist has helped him. He has also been an advocate for the NHL's "BellLetsTalk," program.

On July 7, 2019, Greer and then Columbus Blue Jackets forward Sonny Milano, were arrested in New York City for alleged assault. The alleged assault was reportedly over the victim demanding money after getting Greer and Milano table service at a NYC night club. Greer was not required to be present for his court date on September 4 and the charges were subsequently dropped in January 2020 after Greer and Milano paid an undisclosed amount for the victims medical bills and completed community service.

Career statistics

Awards and honours

References

External links

 

1996 births
Living people
Anglophone Quebec people
Binghamton Devils players
Boston Bruins players
Boston University Terriers men's ice hockey players
Bridgeport Sound Tigers players
Canadian ice hockey left wingers
Colorado Avalanche draft picks
Colorado Avalanche players
Colorado Eagles players
Des Moines Buccaneers players
New Jersey Devils players
Rouyn-Noranda Huskies players
San Antonio Rampage players
Utica Comets players